Willow-leaved fig may refer to:

 Ficus neriifolia, native to Asia
 Ficus salicifolia, native to Africa